Coldstream is a home rule-class city in Jefferson County, Kentucky, United States. The population was 1,100 at the 2010 census, up from 956 at the 2000 census.

Geography
Coldstream is located in northeastern Jefferson County at  (38.317031, -85.528809). It is bordered to the northeast by Orchard Grass Hills in Oldham County and to the south by Worthington Hills. Kentucky Route 22 (Ballardsville Road) forms the northern border of the community, leading east  to Crestwood and west  to Interstate 265, the outer beltway around Louisville.

Demographics

As of the census of 2000, there were 956 people, 322 households, and 278 families residing in the city. The racial makeup of the city was 67.89% White, 26.67% Black or African American, 2.09% Asian, 2.09% from other races, and 1.26% from two or more races. Hispanic or Latino of any race were 3.14% of the population.

There were 322 households, out of which 49.4% had children under the age of 18 living with them, 68.3% were married couples living together, 13.0% had a female householder with no husband present, and 13.4% were non-families. 10.2% of all households were made up of individuals, and 1.2% had someone living alone who was 65 years of age or older. The average household size was 2.97 and the average family size was 3.16.

In the city, the population was spread out, with 31.0% under the age of 18, 8.5% from 18 to 24, 36.6% from 25 to 44, 22.3% from 45 to 64, and 1.7% who were 65 years of age or older. The median age was 31 years. For every 100 females, there were 96.3 males. For every 100 females age 18 and over, there were 98.2 males.

The median income for a household in the city was $60,192, and the median income for a family was $61,528. Males had a median income of $39,844 versus $29,297 for females. The per capita income for the city was $22,810. About 1.1% of families and 1.7% of the population were below the poverty line, including 1.4% of those under age 18 and none of those age 65 or over.

References

External links
City of Coldstream official website

Cities in Kentucky
Cities in Jefferson County, Kentucky
Louisville metropolitan area
Populated places established in 1983